Rottblatt is a German and Yiddish language name. Roth+Blatt literally means "red leaf". The versions of the surname are Rotblatt, Rothblat and Rotblat.

The surname may refer to:

Julie Rotblatt-Amrany, American sculptor and painter
Marv Rotblatt, American baseballer
Martine Rothblatt, American lawyer, author, and entrepreneur
Joseph Rotblat, Polish-Jewish physicist
Lejb Rotblat, activist of the Jewish resistance movement in the Warsaw Ghetto

German-language surnames
Yiddish-language surnames